Rangapur (Village ID 574720) is a village and panchayat in Ranga Reddy district, AP, India. It falls under Shabad mandal. According to the 2011 census it has a population of 15 living in 3 households. Its main agriculture product is maize growing.

References

Villages in Ranga Reddy district